Dina Páucar (Tingo María, Huánuco, 1969) is a Peruvian Andean music singer and composer.

Life
Paucar was born in Tingo María, Huánuco en 1969. At the age of 10, she left her hometown to Peru's capital, Lima, where she did many lower-paid jobs: street vendor, food vendor, and housemaid. In many opportunities Paucar has said that she faced discrmination for being Andean Quechua-speaking women.

After years of hard work, she was able to open a space within the Huayno music scene. Her musical albums became best-sellers and Paucar become one of the most successful singers and composers of contemporary Andean music. In 2004 Dina Paucar la lucha por un sueño, a TV sitcom inspired in her life and trajectory, was aired.

Awards and honors
In 2008 Paucar was name a Goodwill ambassador by UNICEF. In 2016 she was recognized as a Lima cultural ambassador by Peru's Ministry of Culture.

Music

 Dina Páucar (1994), La voz del amor: Mi tesoro. Prodisar E.I.R. Ltda., Lima. Casete
 La Diosa Hermosa del Amor. Arpa: Elmer Jesús. Danny Producciones, Lima. Disco compacto.
 Reinas del arpa 2003. Sonia Morales, Dina Páucar, Anita Santibáñez, Abencia Meza. Disco mp3 (161 títulos).

References 

1969 births
Living people
21st-century Peruvian women singers
21st-century Peruvian singers
20th-century Peruvian women singers
20th-century Peruvian singers
Peruvian singer-songwriters
Peruvian people of Quechua descent
Quechua-language singers